Antillotyphlops is a genus of snakes in the family Typhlopidae.

Distribution
The 12 species of the genus Antillotyphlops are found on Caribbean islands.

Species
The following species are recognized as being valid.
Antillotyphlops annae 
Antillotyphlops catapontus 
Antillotyphlops dominicanus 
Antillotyphlops geotomus 
Antillotyphlops granti 
Antillotyphlops guadeloupensis 
Antillotyphlops hypomethes 
Antillotyphlops monastus 
Antillotyphlops monensis 
Antillotyphlops naugus 
Antillotyphlops platycephalus 
Antillotyphlops richardi 

Nota bene A binomial authority in parentheses indicates that the species was originally described in a genus other than Antillotyphlops.

References

Further reading
Hedges SB, Marion AB, Lipp KM, Marin J, Vidal N (2014). "A taxonomic framework for typhlopid snakes from the Caribbean and other regions (Reptilia, Squamata)". Caribbean Herpetology 49: 1-61. (Antillotyphlops, new genus, pp. 44–46).

 
Snake genera